Shao Renzhe (born 13 April 1999) is a Chinese footballer currently playing as a forward.

Club career
Shao Renzhe would play for the Zhejiang youth team before being promoted to the senior team. He would soon be loaned out to third club Fujian Tianxin on 2 March 2019. On his return he would make his debut for Zhejiang in the 2020 Chinese FA Cup on 29 November 2020 against Shandong Luneng Taishan in a 2-0 defeat. He would gradually start to establish himself as a regular within the team as the club gained promotion to the top tier at the end of the 2021 campaign. On 30 April 2022, Shao would transfer to second tier club Nanjing City.

Career statistics
.

References

External links
Renzhe Shao at WorldFootball.net

1999 births
Living people
Chinese footballers
Association football forwards
China League Two players
China League One players
Zhejiang Professional F.C. players